This is a family tree of the Kings of the Belgians, hereditary, constitutional monarchs of Belgium as defined by the Belgian Constitution.

Belgium
Belgium